Carey Brewbaker was an American football coach. He started coaching at Durham High School, where his teams won or shared five state championships from 1938 to 1945. He then spent eighteen years as the defensive line coach on Earle Edwards' coaching staff at North Carolina State University. NC State won five Atlantic Coast Conference championships during Brewbaker's tenure. Brewbaker was inducted posthumously into the North Carolina Sports Hall of Fame in 2004.

References

Year of birth missing
Year of death missing
High school football coaches in North Carolina
NC State Wolfpack football coaches